The 44th Los Angeles Film Critics Association Awards, given by the Los Angeles Film Critics Association (LAFCA), honored the best in film for 2018.

Winners

Best Picture:
Roma
Runner-up: Burning
Best Director:
Debra Granik – Leave No Trace
Runner-up: Alfonso Cuarón – Roma
Best Actor:
Ethan Hawke – First Reformed
Runner-up: Ben Foster – Leave No Trace
Best Actress:
Olivia Colman – The Favourite
Runner-up: Toni Collette – Hereditary
Best Supporting Actor:
Steven Yeun – Burning
Runner-up: Hugh Grant – Paddington 2
Best Supporting Actress:
Regina King – If Beale Street Could Talk
Runner-up: Elizabeth Debicki – Widows
Best Screenplay:
Nicole Holofcener and Jeff Whitty – Can You Ever Forgive Me?
Runner-up: Deborah Davis and Tony McNamara – The Favourite
Best Cinematography:
Alfonso Cuarón – Roma
Runner-up: James Laxton – If Beale Street Could Talk
Best Editing:
Joshua Altman and Bing Liu – Minding the Gap
Runner-up: Alfonso Cuarón and Adam Gough – Roma
Best Production Design:
Hannah Beachler – Black Panther
Runner-up: Fiona Crombie – The Favourite
Best Music Score:
Nicholas Britell – If Beale Street Could Talk
Runner-up: Justin Hurwitz – First Man
Best Foreign Language Film (TIE):
Burning • South Korea
Shoplifters • Japan
Best Documentary/Non-Fiction Film:
Shirkers
Runner-up: Minding the Gap
Best Animation:
Spider-Man: Into the Spider-Verse
Runner-up: Incredibles 2
New Generation Award:
Chloé Zhao
Career Achievement Award:
Hayao Miyazaki
The Douglas Edwards Experimental/Independent Film/Video Award:
Evan Johnson, Galen Johnson, and Guy Maddin – The Green Fog
Special Citation:
The Other Side of the Wind

References

External links
 44th Annual Los Angeles Film Critics Association Awards

2018
Los Angeles Film Critics Association Awards
Los Angeles Film Critics Association Awards
Los Angeles Film Critics Association Awards
Los Angeles Film Critics Association Awards